The Henry George theorem states that under certain conditions, aggregate spending by government on public goods will increase aggregate rent based on land value (land rent) more than that amount, with the benefit of the last marginal investment equaling its cost.  The theory is named for 19th century U.S. political economist and activist Henry George.

Theory 
This general relationship, first noted by the French physiocrats in the 18th century, is one basis for advocating the collection of a tax based on land rents to help defray the cost of public investment that helps create land values. Henry George popularized this method of raising public revenue in his works (especially in Progress and Poverty), which launched the 'single tax' movement.

In 1977, Joseph Stiglitz showed that under certain conditions, beneficial investments in public goods will increase aggregate land rents by at least as much as the investments' cost. This proposition was dubbed the "Henry George theorem", as it characterizes a situation where Henry George's 'single tax' on land values, is not only efficient, it is also the only tax necessary to finance public expenditures.  Henry George had famously advocated for the replacement of all other taxes with a land value tax, arguing that as the location value of land was improved by public works, its economic rent was the most logical source of public revenue. The often cited passage is titled "The unbound Savannah."

Although the conditions specified in Stiglitz's paper do not strictly match reality, actual conditions are often close enough to the theoretical ideals that the great majority of government spending does indeed appear as increased land value.

Subsequent studies generalized the principle and found that the theorem holds even after relaxing assumptions.  Studies indicate that even existing land prices, which are depressed due to the existing burden of taxation on labor and investment, are great enough to replace taxes at all levels of government.

Economists later discussed whether the theorem provides a practical guide for determining optimal city and enterprise size. Mathematical treatments suggest that an entity obtains optimal population when the opposing marginal costs and marginal benefits of additional residents are balanced.

The status quo alternative is that the bulk of the value of public improvements is captured by the landowners, because the state has only (unfocused) income and capital taxes by which to do so.

See also
 Geolibertarianism
 Georgism
 Land value tax
 Public goods
 Value capture

References

External links
 
  
 
 
 

Economics theorems
Georgism
Land value taxation